Volvation (from Latin volvere "roll", and the suffix -(a)tion; sometimes called enrolment or conglobation), is a defensive behavior in certain animals, in which the animal rolls its own body into a ball, presenting only the hardest parts of its integument (the animal's "armor"), or its spines to predators. 

Among mammals, vertebrates like pangolins (Manidae) and hedgehogs (Tenrecinae) exhibit the ability to conglobate. Armadillos in the genus Tolypeutes (South American three-banded armadillos) are able to roll into a defensive ball; however the nine-banded armadillo and other species have too many plates.

Earthworms may volvate during periods of extreme heat or drought.

Among pill millipedes, volvation is both a protection against external threats and against dehydration.

Woodlice or pillbugs (Armadillidae) curl themselves into "pills" not only for defense, but also to conserve moisture while resting or sleeping, because they must keep their pseudotrachaea ("gills") wet. Volvation is particularly well evolved in subterranean isopods, but only Caecosphaeroma burgundum is able to roll up into a hermetic sphere without any outward projections, and thus "approaches perfection in volvation".

Multi-shelled chitons also volvate, although evidence suggests that they do not use this behavior as an anti-predatory defense but rather as a form of locomotion.

In vertebrates, an animal's decision to volvate is mediated by the periaqueductal gray region.

Gallery

Ethology
Predation
Antipredator adaptations

See also 
Rotating locomotion in living systems

References